Psilocybe jaliscana is a species of mushroom in the family Hymenogastraceae. This mushroom may contain the psychoactive compound psilocybin.

See also
List of Psilocybin mushrooms
Psilocybin mushrooms
Psilocybe

References

Entheogens
Psychoactive fungi
jaliscana
Psychedelic tryptamine carriers
Fungi of North America